is a Japanese manga series written and illustrated by Tomiyaki Kagisora. It was serialized in Square Enix's shōnen manga magazine Gangan Joker from May 2015 to June 2019. The series is licensed by Yen Press. An anime television series adaptation by Ezo'la aired during the Animeism programming block from July to September 2018.

Plot
The series is centered on high school girl Satō Matsuzaka who befriends a mysterious little girl named Shio, who was abandoned by her mother, and immediately becomes highly attached to her. They both agree to live together in Satō's apartment, and the former vows to protect that feeling of love, even if it means committing crimes or even killing people.

Characters

Satō is a teenage girl who comes to love Shio and keeps her in her apartment. She maintains a kind facade in public in order to earn money for her and Shio, but will resort to anything in order to protect Shio. She is a first-year high school student at Makiko High School and also works at a cosplay restaurant called Cure á Cute as a waitress in order to support both Shio and herself.

An innocent little girl who lives at Satō's apartment. She cares for Satō deeply, but often remains unaware of what she is involved in until later episodes, since Satō doesn't allow her outside of their apartment; she is later revealed to be Asahi's younger sister. In the final episode, she sustains minor injuries and ended up in the hospital after hugging Satō while pushing them off their apartment roof, with Satō dying from the fall. After Satō's death, Shio keeps Sato's wedding ring and her hair ribbon as a memento to remember her; she also claims that she has been reborn as Satō, much to Asahi's horrific shock, and believes that Satō will be reborn in the future.

A boy who is searching for the whereabouts of Shio. He is later revealed to be Shio's older brother; it is hinted that he had romantic feelings for Shōko after she had stolen his first kiss, and then becomes traumatized and devastated when he finds Shōko's corpse in the fire. In the final episode, he is shown visiting his sister Shio in the hospital with a bouquet of flowers.

A high school boy who works alongside Satō at a family restaurant. Being held captive and raped by his former boss causes him to develop a great fear of older women. First laying eyes on a flyer of Shio's disappearance makes him find comfort in Shio's innocence and he becomes obsessed with her. In the final episode, he became emotionally broken due to being raped by Satō's aunt and being led to believe that Shio died from the fire; it is implied that he since has adopted a reclusive lifestyle.

Satō's best friend and co-worker who comes from a rich family. She is killed by Satō after discovering her secret relationship with Shio. Her body is eventually burned in the final episode, though the police manage to identify her and arrest Satō's aunt as a result.

Satō's high school teacher. Underneath his handsome looks and friendly personality, he is revealed to be a pervert with sadomasochistic tendencies who is obsessed with Satō, hinting that he has a crush on her. Threatened to have this revealed to his family, he is forced to dispose of some evidence for Satō. In the final episode, he is taken by the police to be questioned for the crimes he committed.
Satō's aunt

An unnamed relative of Satō who had taken full custody of her after her parents died many years ago. It was thought that she may have been killed by her own niece since she was mostly shown in flashback sequences when Satō was a child. However, it is revealed that she is alive, apart from a few parts of her body which are seen covered in bandages. Despite her happy and cheery nature, she is mentally unstable as well as being deeply insane, and accepts all forms of desires towards her with disturbing masochistic pleasure. Her deeply twisted views of love are responsible for molding Satō into the deranged psychopath that she is today. She lives in the same apartment complex as her niece, but on a different room floor. In the final episode, she is arrested for arson and first-degree murder of Satō and Shōko (even though Satō was the one responsible for Shōko's death).

Satō's next-door neighbor and co-worker who refers to her as "senpai"; she holds romantic feelings towards her. Just like Satō, Shōko, & Taiyo, she attends a different school. During the final episode, after hearing about Satō's death on the news channel, Sumire is seen deeply crushed and upset by this, to the point where she drops her school bag on the floor in shock. 

Asahi and Shio's mother. Originally a kind-hearted woman, she was forced to marry a man she did not love after she was raped and impregnated with her two children while she was in high school; she is featured in the flashbacks of her children and in her backstory. It is hinted that she suffered from borderline personality disorder mostly due to the domestic abuse that she had suffered from her husband, who later died from alcohol poisoning, but it is later learned towards the end of the series that she had poisoned her husband. In the final episode, she is shown standing outside of the hospital that her daughter, Shio, is being treated at.

Media

Manga
Tomiyaki Kagisora launched the manga in Square Enix's shōnen manga magazine Gangan Joker on May 22, 2015. Eight tankōbon volumes of the manga were released from October 22, 2015 to June 22, 2018. The series ended in the June 22, 2019 issue of Gangan Joker, with the ninth and tenth volumes of the manga releasing on July 22, 2019. On July 8, 2018, during their panel at Anime Expo, Yen Press announced that they had licensed the manga.

Volume list

Anime
The anime television series adaptation was directed by Keizō Kusakawa and Nobuyoshi Nagayama and written by Touko Machida, with animation by studio Ezo'la. Shōko Yasuda provided the character designs.

Youko Matsubara was the color key artist for the series and Kiyotaka Yachi directed the background art. Yasuyuki Itou served as director of photography, while Yayoi Tateishi was the sound director. The series was edited by Yuuji Oka. Koichiro Kameyama composed the series' music. The opening theme song,  was performed by Akari Nanawo, while the ending theme song, "Sweet Hurt", was performed by Reona.

The 12-episode series aired in Japan from July 14 to September 29, 2018, broadcasting during the Animeism programming block on MBS, TBS, BS-TBS, and AT-X. The series was simulcasted exclusively on Amazon Video worldwide.

Episode list

Notes

References

External links
  
  
 
 

Anime series based on manga
Animeism
Ezo'la
Gangan Comics manga
Japanese LGBT-related animated television series
Mainichi Broadcasting System original programming
Psychological horror anime and manga
Psychological thriller anime and manga
Shōnen manga
Square Enix franchises
Television series about bullying
Yen Press titles
Yuri (genre) anime and manga